The 1996 Canadian Grand Prix was a Formula One motor race held at the Circuit Gilles Villeneuve, Montreal on 16 June 1996. It was the eighth race of the 1996 Formula One World Championship.

The 69-lap race was won from pole position by Englishman Damon Hill, driving a Williams-Renault. Local driver Jacques Villeneuve, Hill's teammate and the son of Gilles, finished second, with Frenchman Jean Alesi third in a Benetton-Renault.

Report

Michael Schumacher started from the back of the grid, as his car suffered a fuel pressure problem as the field set off on the warm-up lap. This started a run of mechanical problems for the reigning double World Champion.

Eddie Irvine became the first retirement from 4th position in the leading Ferrari on lap 2 when his suspension failed, he was then followed out by Ukyo Katayama in the second Tyrrell and Ricardo Rosset in the second Footwork when they collided at the final chicane on lap 7 due to Katayama missing his braking point. Before Rosset's teammate Jos Verstappen in the leading Footwork retired in the pits on lap 11 when his engine failed. Rubens Barrichello in the second Jordan after passing Mika Hakkinen for 6th position would also be forced the retire on lap 23 in the pits after his first pit stop when his clutch failed. Michael Schumacher after starting at the back of the grid due to a clutch problem, was able to fight his way up to 13th position, but would soon retire due to driveshaft failure on lap 42 which started the first of three consecutive races which both Ferrari's would fail to finish a race due to mechanical failures.
For the second successive race, Gerhard Berger spun off and hit the wall while trying to pass teammate Jean Alesi on lap 43 at turn 4. Alesi continued to third place, while further behind Martin Brundle, running fourth following Berger's exit, had to pit for a new nose-cone following a collision with Pedro Lamy's Minardi when Lamy inadvertently hit Brundle's front wing as he attempted to rejoin the track after a spin on lap 45, dropping Brundle to seventh and handing fourth place to David Coulthard's McLaren. Brundle eventually recovered to sixth place behind Mika Häkkinen in the sister McLaren after getting past Johnny Herbert courtesy of a faster final pit stop.

Classification

Qualifying

Race

Championship standings after the race 

Drivers' Championship standings

Constructors' Championship standings

References

Canadian Grand Prix
Canadian Grand Prix
Grand Prix
Grand Prix